Masalai are a type of supernatural spirit in Papua New Guinea. 

Margaret Mead defined them as: "supernatural beings that inhabit
specific  places,  usually  distinguished by some special natural feature (a water hole, waterfall, bend in a river, cliff, marsh, etc.), and that  exercise limited jurisdiction over their own  area; they  may manifest themselves as snakes, crocodiles and other creatures, often  with  bizarre features, such as strange coloring, two  heads, etc. Masalai may be associated with descent lines, moieties, hamlets, villages." 

According to legend, Masalai may employ trickery to seduce people, causing genital bleeding and death. White people were sometimes mistaken for masalai  because their clothes resembled snake skin being shed. There are numerous folk tales about the masalai.

References

External links
 Masalai in Papua New Guinea
 What is a masalai?

Papua New Guinean culture